South West Forests Defence Foundation (SFDF) is a group that has been involved in the conservation of the jarrah and karri forests of the South West region of Western Australia for more than four decades.

It was formed at approximately the same time as the government of Charles Court expressed interest in exploiting forests in the south west for woodchipping. Around the same time, the forests of the Darling Scarp were being allocated for removal for the  mining of bauxite.  Another group, the Campaign to Save Native Forests (CSNF), worked in co-operation with the SFDF on publishing critiques of the environmental conditions for the woodchipping at Manjimup. The SFDF continued to take issue with industry and government plans for karri forests on the south coast region, and it was not until the late 1990s that the region was given limited protection from forestry by the creation of national parks and reserves.

Newsletter

Select publications

References

External links
 https://southwestforestsdefence.org/

Nature conservation organisations based in Australia
Nature conservation in Western Australia